"Good Love" is a single recorded by Klymaxx for the MCA label. Relying on an outside producer and songwriters, this song was recorded and released as the first single from their sixth album, The Maxx Is Back. This song reached number four on the Billboard R&B Singles chart. At this time, the group only consisted of 3 members.

Credits
Lead vocals Lorena Porter
Background vocals by Klymaxx

1990 singles
Klymaxx songs
1990 songs
MCA Records singles
Songs written by Vassal Benford
Songs written by Ronald Spearman